Betker is a surname. Notable people with the surname include:

Jan Betker (born 1960), Canadian curler
Lars Betker (born 1971), German weightlifter

See also
Becker
Beker (disambiguation)
Betke